The sixteenth series of Warsaw Shore, a Polish television programme based in Warsaw, Poland was announced in May 2021 and began airing on 19 September 2021. The series was filmed in the Polish seaside town Łeba. This is the first series since the thirteen season to be filmed in public places, this due to the situation in Poland during the COVID-19 pandemic. This is also the first series not to include Ewa Piekut, Damian "Dzik" Graf, Kinga Gondorowicz, and Maciek Szczukiewicz after their departures the previous season. Ewelina Kubiak and Daniel Jabłoński returned as main cast members. It was also the first series to include only one new cast member, Michał "Sarna" Sarnowski. The series also featured the show's 200th episode. This was the final series to feature  Kasjusz "Don Kasjo" Życiński following his decision to quit the show.  This was the final series to include cast members Daniel "Arnold" Jabłoński, Patrycja Morkowska, Radosław "Diva" Majchrowski, and the original member Ewelina Kubiak.

Cast 
 Damian "Dzik" Graf (Episode 10–11)
 Daniel "Arnold" Jabłoński
 Radosław "Diva" Majchrowski
 Ewelina Kubiak
 Jeremiasz "Jez" Szmigiel
 Kamil Jagielski
 Kasjusz "Don Kasjo" Życiński
 Lena Majewska
 Milena Łaszek
 Oliwia Dziatkiewicz
 Patrycja Morkowska
 Patryk Spiker
 Piotr "Pedro" Polak (Episode 5–6)
 Michał "Sarna" Sarnowski

Duration of cast

Notes 

 Key:  = "Cast member" is featured in this episode.
 Key:  = "Cast member" arrives in the house.
 Key:  = "Cast member" voluntarily leaves the house.
 Key:  = "Cast member" returns to the house.
 Key:  = "Cast member" leaves the series.
 Key:  = "Cast member" returns to the series.

Episodes

References

2021 Polish television seasons
Series 16